Until 1 January 2007 Tommerup municipality was a municipality (Danish, kommune) in the former Funen County in central Denmark.  The municipality covered an area of 74 km2, and had a total population of 7,865 (2006). Its last mayor was Finn Brunse, a member of the Social Democrats (Socialdemokraterne) political party.

The municipality's main city and the site of its municipal council was Tommerup.

 Broholm Parish
 Brylle Parish
 Tommerup Parish
 Verninge Parish

Tommerup municipality ceased to exist as the result of Kommunalreformen ("The Municipality Reform" of 2007).  It was merged with Haarby, Glamsbjerg, Assens, Aarup and Vissenbjerg municipality to form a new Assens municipality.  This created a municipality with an area of 513 km2 and a total population of 41,201 (2005).  The new municipality belongs to Region of Southern Denmark.

On the area of Tommerup municipality there is the Tommerup transmitter, whose guyed mast is the tallest construction of Denmark (excluding Greenland).

International relations

Twin towns — Sister cities
 Väike-Maarja Parish, Estonia (1995–2007)

External links 
 The new Assens municipality's official website (Danish only)

References 
 Municipal statistics: NetBorger Kommunefakta, delivered from KMD aka Kommunedata (Municipal Data)
 Municipal mergers and neighbors: Eniro new municipalities map

Former municipalities of Denmark